Michael Feast (born 25 November 1946) is an English actor of stage and screen. He was born in Brighton, and trained at the Central School of Speech and Drama. He performed in the original 1968 London production of Hair. He worked several times with John Gielgud, whom he later played in Nicolas de Jongh's biographical play Plague Over England. Feast had a significant role in the acclaimed TV series State of Play. He also played Aeron Greyjoy in the sixth season of the HBO series Game of Thrones.

His film credits include roles in I Start Counting (1970), Private Road (1971), Brother Sun, Sister Moon (1972), Got It Made (1974), Hardcore (1977), The Music Machine (1979), McVicar (1980), The Draughtsman's Contract (1982), The Fool (1990), Velvet Goldmine (1998), Prometheus (1998), The Tribe (1998), Sleepy Hollow (1999), Long Time Dead (2002), Boudica (2003), Penelope (2006), The Deaths of Ian Stone (2007) and There Be Dragons (2011).

Selected theatre performances
Hair (Original London Cast Recording) 1968
 Nicholas Beckett in What the Butler Saw by Joe Orton. Directed by Braham Murray at the Royal Exchange, Manchester. (1977)
 Henry in The Skin of Our Teeth by Thornton Wilder. Directed by Richard Negri and James Maxwell at the Royal Exchange, Manchester. (1977)
 Telegin in Uncle Vanya by Anton Chekhov. Directed by Michael Elliott at the Royal Exchange, Manchester. (1977)
 Roland Maule in Present Laughter by Noël Coward. Directed by James Maxwell at the Royal Exchange, Manchester.  (1977)
 Billy Bigelow in Carousel by Rodgers and Hammerstein. Directed by Steven Pimlott at the Royal Exchange, Manchester. (1984)
 Subtle in The Alchemist by Ben Jonson. Directed by Greg Hersov at the Royal Exchange, Manchester. (1987)

Filmography

Film

Start Counting (1970) 
Private Road (1971) 
Brother Sun, Sister Moon (1972) 
Got It Made (1974) 
Hardcore (1977) 
The Music Machine (1979) 
McVicar (1980) 
The Draughtsman's Contract (1982) 
The Fool (1990) 
Velvet Goldmine (1998) 
Prometheus (1998) 
The Tribe (1998) 
Sleepy Hollow (1999) 
Long Time Dead (2002) 
Boudica (2003) 
Penelope (2006) 
The Deaths of Ian Stone (2007) 
There Be Dragons (2011)

Selected theatre performances

Television

References

External links
 

1946 births
Living people
male actors from Brighton
English male stage actors
English male musical theatre actors